{{DISPLAYTITLE:Gamma2 Fornacis}}

Gamma2 Fornacis, a name Latinized from γ2 Fornacis, is a single star in the southern constellation Fornax. It has a white hue and is faintly visible to the naked eye at night with an apparent visual magnitude of 5.4. The distance to Gamma2 Fornacis is approximately 520 light years based on parallax. It is drifting further away with a radial velocity of 24 km/s. Gamma1 Fornacis is a 6th magnitude star about four degrees to the north.

The stellar classification of Gamma2 Fornacis is A1 V, which is notation for an A-type main-sequence star that, like the Sun, is generating energy through core hydrogen fusion. Comparison of its properties to theoretical models suggest an age of about 400 million years old. It has a high rate of spin, showing a projected rotational velocity of 149 km/s. The star has 2.4 times the mass of the Sun and 4.5 times the Sun's radius. It is radiating 117 times the luminosity of the Sun from its photosphere at an effective temperature of roughly 9,000 K.

References

A-type main-sequence stars
Fornax (constellation)
Fornacis, Gamma2
Durchmusterung objects
017729
013202
0845